Vidette Ryan (born 20 May 1984) is a South African field hockey player who competed in the 2008 Summer Olympics. Her twin sister is Vida Ryan.

References

External links

1984 births
Living people
South African female field hockey players
Olympic field hockey players of South Africa
Field hockey players at the 2008 Summer Olympics
21st-century South African women